Iimura (written: 飯村) is a Japanese surname. Notable people with the surname include:

Izumi Iimura (born 1980), Japanese women's cricketer
, Japanese general
Rikiya Iimura, Japanese karateka
, Japanese film director

Japanese-language surnames